Moel Ysgyfarnogod (Bare hill of the hares in Welsh) is a mountain in Snowdonia, North Wales and is the northernmost of the Rhinogydd. Rhinog Fawr lies directly south.

It overlooks Llyn Trawsfynydd, and from the summit it is possible to see the towns of Porthmadog and Blaenau Ffestiniog. It may be climbed from Trawsfynydd in the east, or from Talsarnau in the west.

To the north-west of the summit, on an area of moorland and rocky outcrops, lies Bryn Cader Faner, an ancient stone circle. It is one of the finest examples of a Bronze Age cairn in Britain, and has rocky standing stones along its circumference.

References

External links
 www.geograph.co.uk : photos of Moel Ysgyfarnogod and surrounding area
 A Walk up Moel Ysgyfarnogod From Trawsfynydd with photos

Talsarnau
Trawsfynydd
Mountains and hills of Gwynedd
Mountains and hills of Snowdonia
Hewitts of Wales
Marilyns of Wales
Nuttalls